Poème symphonique is a 1962 composition by György Ligeti for one hundred mechanical metronomes. It was written during his brief acquaintance with the Fluxus movement.

Overview
The piece requires ten "performers", each one responsible for ten of the hundred metronomes. The metronomes are set up on the performance platform, and they are then all wound to their maximum extent and set to different speeds. Once they are all fully wound, there is a silence of two to six minutes, at the discretion of the conductor; then, at the conductor's signal, all of the metronomes are started as simultaneously as possible. The performers then leave the stage. As the metronomes wind down one after another and stop, periodicity becomes noticeable in the sound, and individual metronomes can be more clearly distinguished. The piece typically ends with just one metronome ticking alone for a few beats, followed by silence, and then the performers return to the stage.

The controversy over the first performance was sufficient to cause Dutch Television to cancel a planned broadcast recorded two days earlier at an official reception at Hilversum's City Hall on 13 September 1963. "Instead, they showed a soccer game". Ligeti regarded this work as a critique of the contemporary musical situation, continuing:

Poème symphonique was the last of Ligeti's event-scores, and marks the end of his brief relationship with Fluxus. The piece has been recorded several times, but performed only occasionally.

References

Citations

Sources

Further reading
 
 
 

Compositions by György Ligeti
1962 compositions